Princess Alexandra of Denmark (1844–1925) was the wife of Edward VII and Queen consort of the United Kingdom from 1901 to 1910.

Princess Alexandra of Denmark may also refer to:

 Alexandra, Countess of Frederiksborg (born 1964), formerly Princess Alexandra of Denmark by marriage to Prince Joachim of Denmark (divorced in 2005)

See also
 Alexandra of Greece and Denmark (disambiguation)